D-Rad was a motorcycle factory in Berlin (Spandau), Germany. The factory was founded as Star, but in 1923 Deutsche Industrie-Werke took it over and changed the name to D-Rad. NSU merged with Deutsche Industrie-Werke in 1932 and terminated D-Rad production in 1933.

External links 
Swiss website about D-Rad 

Motorcycle manufacturers of Germany
Manufacturing companies based in Berlin
Spandau